Sammy J & Randy in Ricketts Lane is a six-part Australian television comedy series starring comedian Sammy J and Randy, a purple puppet, which aired in September 2015 on ABC TV.

Plot
Sammy J is a hopeless lawyer who six years into his legal career has yet to win a case. This is not helped by his tendency to wet himself in court, nor the relentless bullying of his sadistic boss Borkman. Randy (the purple puppet) hit rock bottom after the divorce from his wife, the host of a top-rating current affairs program, "Thumbs Down with Victoria Vincent". Apart from cheating on his wife, Randy's hobbies included gambling, drinking, and cheating on his wife. After Sammy J managed to lose him everything in the divorce case, he offered his spare room at Ricketts Lane to Randy for a fortnight but that was twelve months ago.

Cast
 Sammy J as Sammy J
 Heath McIvor as Randy
 Georgia Chara as Wednesday
 Nathan Lovejoy as Borkman 
 Sam Healy as Victoria Vincent 
 Dilruk Jayasinha as Michael
 Francis Greenslade as Judge

Episodes 
The episode titles are all taken from films starring Kevin Costner.

Broadcast
The six-part series was made available on ABC iview on 1 September 2015, and aired on ABC TV from 14 October 2015. It is described as a sitcom with songs and puppetry, aimed at an adult audience.

In the United States, the series aired on Seeso.

Home media
A DVD containing all six episodes from the series was released by Roadshow Entertainment in Australia on 25 November 2015.

Awards
2016: Australian Directors Guild Award, for Best Direction in a TV Comedy, for episode 1 (Jonathan Brough)

See also
List of Australian television series
List of programs broadcast by ABC Television

References

External links

2015 Australian television series debuts
Australian Broadcasting Corporation original programming
Australian comedy television series
Australian television shows featuring puppetry